Red River County is a county in the U.S. state of Texas. As of the 2010 census, its population was 11,587. Its county seat is Clarksville. The county was created in 1835 and organized in 1837. It is named for the Red River, which forms its northern boundary. Red River County was the birthplace of John Nance Garner, 32nd Vice President of the United States.

Geography

Major highways
  U.S. Highway 82
  U.S. Highway 271
  State Highway 37

Adjacent counties

 McCurtain County, Oklahoma (north)
 Bowie County (east)
 Morris County (southeast)
 Titus County (south)
 Franklin County (southwest)
 Delta County (southwest)
 Lamar County (west)
 Choctaw County, Oklahoma (northwest)

Communities

Cities

 Bogata
 Clarksville (county seat)
 Deport (mostly in Lamar County)
 Detroit

Towns
 Annona
 Avery

Unincorporated communities
 Aikin Grove
 Albion
 Bagwell
 English
 Maple
 Negley
 McCoinville

Ghost town
 Opah

Demographics

Note: the US Census treats Hispanic/Latino as an ethnic category. This table excludes Latinos from the racial categories and assigns them to a separate category. Hispanics/Latinos can be of any race.

As of the census of 2000, there were 14,314 people, 5,827 households, and 4,067 families residing in the county. In 2020, its population was 11,587. From the 2000 census, the population density was 14 people per square mile (5/km2).  There were 6,916 housing units at an average density of 7 per square mile (3/km2).  The racial makeup of the county was 78.04% White, 17.80% Black or African American, 0.59% Native American, 0.12% Asian, 0.01% Pacific Islander, 2.29% from other races, and 1.15% from two or more races.  4.67% of the population were Hispanic or Latino of any race.

There were 5,827 households, out of which 28.00% had children under the age of 18 living with them, 53.50% were married couples living together, 11.80% had a female householder with no husband present, and 30.20% were non-families. 27.70% of all households were made up of individuals, and 14.60% had someone living alone who was 65 years of age or older.  The average household size was 2.41 and the average family size was 2.91.

In the county, the population was spread out, with 23.90% under the age of 18, 7.80% from 18 to 24, 24.40% from 25 to 44, 24.30% from 45 to 64, and 19.70% who were 65 years of age or older.  The median age was 40 years. For every 100 females there were 92.90 males.  For every 100 females age 18 and over, there were 89.80 males.

The median income for a household in the county was $27,558, and the median income for a family was $33,436. Males had a median income of $24,609 versus $17,566 for females. The per capita income for the county was $15,058, making it one of the economically poorest counties in the state of Texas.  About 13.10% of families and 17.30% of the population were below the poverty line, including 25.20% of those under age 18 and 17.70% of those age 65 or over.

Education
The following school districts serve Red River County:
 Avery ISD
 Clarksville ISD
 Detroit ISD
 Prairiland ISD (mostly in Lamar County)
 Rivercrest ISD (partly in Titus County, small portion in Franklin County)

Notable people

 Edward H. Tarrant, for whom Tarrant County was named, lived in Red River County when he first moved to Texas in the 1830s.
 John "Cactus Jack" Garner, Vice President of the U.S. who served for eight years under President F. D. Roosevelt, was born in Red River County, in 1868.
 B.P. Newman (1927–2008), a Texas business entrepreneur, developer, and philanthropist based in Laredo, was born in Red River County.
 Jim Leavelle, Dallas homicide detective, who became renowned for escorting Lee Harvey Oswald when Oswald was shot by Jack Ruby, was born here in 1920.
 J. D. Tippit, Dallas policeman, who was shot to death a short time after the John F. Kennedy assassination. A monument to J.D. Tippit is located on Highway 37 South. He was born and raised in Red River County.
 William Humphrey, author of Home from the Hill and The Ardways and other works was born and raised in Red River County. Home from the Hill was made into a movie starring George Hamilton among other great stars.

Politics
Red River County is represented, as of January 2015, in the Texas House of Representatives by the Republican Gary VanDeaver, the former superintendent of the New Boston Independent School District in New Boston, Texas.

See also

 National Register of Historic Places listings in Red River County, Texas
 Recorded Texas Historic Landmarks in Red River County

References

External links
 Red River County government's website
 

 
1837 establishments in the Republic of Texas
Populated places established in 1837